Pristimantis vidua is a species of frog in the family Strabomantidae.
It is endemic to Ecuador.
Its natural habitats are tropical high-altitude shrubland and high-altitude grassland.
It is threatened by habitat loss.

References

vidua
Endemic fauna of Ecuador
Amphibians of Ecuador
Amphibians of the Andes
Amphibians described in 1979
Taxonomy articles created by Polbot